The southern Philippine false gecko (Pseudogekko pungkaypinit) is a species of gecko. It is endemic to the Philippines.

References 

Pseudogekko
Reptiles described in 2014
Reptiles of the Philippines